The Oregon Student Association (OSA), a non-profit organization, was established in 1975 to represent, serve and protect the collective interests of students in post-secondary education in the U.S. state of Oregon.

OSA focuses on issues such as tuition, financial aid, and student rights. OSA also provides a collective voice for students in state government, public universities overseen by theHigher Education Coordinating Commission, and other state boards and commissions.

Member schools
There are currently three member institutions of the Oregon Student Association. Each of OSA's three boards (The Board of Directors, The Oregon Students of Color Coalition, and the Oregon Student Equal Rights Alliance) consist of two student voting members from each member campus:

 Lane Community College - Associated Students of Lane Community College (ASLCC)
 Portland State University - Associated Students of Portland State University (ASPSU)
 University of Oregon - Associated Students of the University of Oregon (ASUO)

See also
United States Student Association

References

External links
As Support Lags, Colleges Tack on Student Fees New York Times article covers OSA lobbying legislature on behalf of students.

Non-profit organizations based in Oregon
Oregon
1975 establishments in Oregon
Groups of students' unions
Lobbying organizations in the United States